Cormorant Lake or Lake Cormorant may refer to:

Cormorant Lake (Manitoba)
Cormorant Lake (Minnesota)
Lake Cormorant, Mississippi, an unincorporated community in DeSoto County

See also
Cormorant Lakes, a group of lakes in Minnesota